The List of bus routes in Maryland could refer to:
 List of MTA Maryland bus routes, primarily serving the Baltimore, Maryland area
 List of Metrobus routes in Maryland, primarily serving the Washington, D.C. area